The 2022 season of Ultimate Kho Kho (UKK) began August 14, 2022 and ended September 4, 2022. There were six teams playing a total of 34 matches. The Odisha Juggernauts beat the Telugu Yoddhas 46-45 in the final.

Teams 

The six teams are named Chennai Quick Guns, Gujarat Giants, Mumbai Khiladis, Odisha Juggernauts, Rajasthan Warriors, and Telugu Yoddhas.

Points Table 

Top 4 teams qualify for playoffs

 3 points awarded for a win
 2 points for a tie
 1 point for a loss by less than 4 points

League stage 
In the first match of the season, played on August 14, Gujarat Giants beat the Mumbai Khiladis 69-44.

In the second match, played later that day, the Telugu Yoddhas beat the Chennai Quick Guns 48-38.

Playoffs 
The Odisha Juggernauts beat the Telugu Yoddhas 46-45 in the final.

References 

Kho-Kho